Cyperus subpapuanus is a species of sedge that is endemic to Papua New Guinea.

The species was first formally described by the botanist Georg Kükenthal in 1931.

See also
 List of Cyperus species

References

subpapuanus
Taxa named by Georg Kükenthal
Plants described in 1931
Flora of Papua New Guinea